Foreign Service Academy is a training academy for foreign service officers of the Bangladesh Civil Service under the Ministry of Foreign Affairs.

History
In the 1980s, the foreign service officers were trained at the Foreign Affairs Training Institute which was later merged with the Bangladesh Civil Service Administration Academy. Foreign Service Academy was established in 1996 by the government of Bangladesh to train foreign service officers after a need for specialized training was recognized. The academy started working from 1 January 1997. On 19 April 2019, the Academy opened a Genocide corner in memory of the Bangladesh genocide during the Bangladesh Liberation war.

Headquarters
The academy was decided to be located Sugandha, a historic colonial era mansion. In the 1960s, Queen Elizabeth II stayed at the mansion. After the Independence of Bangladesh, the mansion was converted to Ganabhaban, the office of the Prime Minister of Bangladesh. In 1996, it became the official headquarters of the Foreign Service Academy.

Principals and rectors 
Until October 2015, the academy was led by a principal, after that by a rector.
 M. Anwar Hashim, December 1996 - January 1999
 Md. Touhid Hossain, January 1999 - February 2000
 Mohiuddin Ahmed, February 2000 - January 2001
 Syed Muazzem Ali, July 2001 - December 2001
 Jamil Majid, June 2002 - November 2006
 Saiful Amin Khan, March 2007 - August 2007
 Shahed Akhtar, Feb 2008 – May 2009
 Md. Touhid Hossain, July 2009 - July 2012
 Mustafa Kamal, August 2012 - January 2015
 Md. Shahidul Haque, January 2015 - October 2015
 Syed Masud Mahmood Khundoker, October 2015 - March 2021
 Shabbir Ahmad Chowdhury, March 2021 - present

References

1997 establishments in Bangladesh
Organisations based in Dhaka
Government agencies of Bangladesh
Research institutes in Bangladesh